Fracas may refer to:
 Fracas! Improv Festival, an improvisational theater festival held at the University of Southern California
 Failure Reporting, Analysis and Corrective Action Systems
 Fracas (video game), a 1980 Apple II video game by Stuart Smith